Sedillo may refer to:
Sedillo, New Mexico, a census-designated place in Bernalillo County, New Mexico, United States
Antoinette Sedillo Lopez (born 1956/1957), American politician
James Sedillo, American politician
Matt Sedillo (born 1981), American political poet, essayist, and activist

See also
Cedillo (surname)